is a manga series written by Dall-Young Lim and illustrated by Soo-Hyun Lee, both who are known for the Korean manhwa Unbalance Unbalance and the light novel The Phantom King. The series revolves around Setsuna Kashiwagi, a Japanese high school student with a chronic heart problem who makes a deal with an Oni for 10 million yen in exchange for his life in a year. He is soon met by Kanna and Rena, two princesses of the Royal Oni Clan who act as bodyguards to protect his heart from other Oni in exchange for one of them eating his heart after the year has passed.

Onihime VS debuted in the special "Hard" issue of Kill Time Communication's male-oriented manga magazine Comic Valkyrie, and began regular serialization in Comic Valkyrie afterwards. The first bound volume was released in Japan on September 30, 2008, and the fourth volume was released on November 2, 2012. The series had a long hiatus from July 27, 2010 to January 27, 2012, resuming serialization in Comic Valkyrie following the finale of Unbalance Unbalance, and ending serialization in the November 2012 issue.

Synopsis
Setsuna Kashiwagi's only desire is for his sister to live a happy life. Weak, frail, and constantly bullied, Setsuna believes he is nothing but a burden to his sister and decides to take his own life. As he prepares to jump off a bridge, a mysterious man appears and presents him with an unusual offer. He offers 10 million yen in exchange for Setsuna's life. If he accepts the contract, after one year, Setsuna will end his life in a manner the man chooses. Skeptical at first, Setsuna accepts. The next morning, thinking it was all just a dream, Setsuna awakens to find two beautiful women sitting beside him. They are Kanna and Rena, Oni princesses who have come to protect Setsuna. The catch: one of them will consume his heart in one year.

After drinking a potion to seal the deal, the host's (in this case Setsuna's) heart will absorb the combined power of the Oni tribe and will ferment increasing that power until it ripens after one year. However, demons will be able to sense the power and want to eat the heart themselves to gain that power even if the Banrikou Heart isn't fully ripe yet. So to protect the heart and determine who gets to eat it at the end of the year (thus becoming the new leader of the Oni,) the princesses guard and live with the host for the year with the winner being decided by which one is summoned the most to protect the heart. However, the one summoned is whichever one the host feels or thinks about more at that time. Any demon is allowed to try to steal the heart without it being a crime as the contestants are only considered fit to rule if they can protect the Heart. But while protecting the Heart the contestants can do whatever they please, up to and including death, to any demon making an attempt to steal the Heart. The host has to be human, has to know that they're going to die at the end of the year, be suicidal enough to be willing to die but not so much as to kill themselves before the Heart is harvested, and drink the potion of their own free will without threats or coercion. In exchange they'll (or rather whoever they will it to) receive 10 million Yen once the Heart is harvested. Advanced payment or the contestants using any of their share of the Oni Family money during that year is against clan law. Thus, the host has to provide for the contestants out of their own pocket, although receiving money from the contestants earning it by doing jobs is ok.

Characters

Humans 

A high school student in the care of his older sister ever since their parents died. Setsuna was born with a weak heart and has been the victim of bullying through most of his life. Overhearing a conversation between his sister and loan sharks, he feels that his life has been just a burden to his sister and decides to commit suicide. Literally on the edge of the bridge, he is confronted by a mysterious man known as the "Middleman". Middleman offers him 10 million yen to postpone his suicide by one year. After Setsuna accepts, he drinks the "Banrikou" as proof of their contract. He wakes up the next morning, thinking it was all a dream until he sees two girls sitting beside him. They introduce themselves as Kanna and Rena, princess sisters from the Oni clan. They explain further that because his Banrikou heart now gives off a scent that attracts demons, they have been sent to protect him until his heart fully matures. If he is attacked by a demon, Setsuna will be able to summon one of the sisters, whomever one he thinks of the most. At the end of the year, once his heart has fully matured, the sister Setsuna summoned the most will consume his heart to obtain the ultimate form. Ever since Setsuna drank Banrikou, his heart problems have disappeared. Although he appears weak and indecisive he really is noble hearted and gentle to the point where he let little kids bully him to protect Kanna (who had forgotten she was strong from a love potion that's only supposed to be used on men) rather than fighting back and hurting them. That and protecting Kanna's feelings while she had amnesia by not telling her she might be eating his heart at the end of a year or taking advantage of her even when she threw herself on him. As such this attracts the feelings of Kanna, Rena, and even Erionelle. Thanks to a Zombie Oni ritual Erionelle used on him at the end of the series his days of being fought over by the sisters, Erionelle and Shoko are going to continue for a while.

Though an introvert, Setsuna has a caring side that surfaces occasionally. He has shown considerable bravery for the sake of protecting the ones close to him.

It is unclear who Setsuna has feelings for. He has shown interest in Kanna, Rena, and Arima. With recent events at the hot springs, it is hinted that Setsuna may have stronger feelings for Kanna although it could just be admiration.

Setsuna's kind-hearted older sister who become Setsuna's guardian after the death of their parents. Mirei has sacrificed everything and tried her best to take care of Setsuna, even borrowing money from loan sharks to pay for hospital fees. When Kanna and Rena appeared, she was in tears over the fact that her brother was able to make friends. Mirei has offered their home to Kanna and Rena but is still completely unaware of Setsuna's imminent death.

Setsuna's classmate and constant bully, along with her two friends. Both beautiful and popular, she picks on him to cover up the fact that she has a huge crush on him, something she has a hard time admitting to herself due to her tsundere personality. After being possessed by a low-level demon she jumps him in the storage room only to be rejected, causing Shoko and the demon feeding on her negative emotions to go berserk and attack Setsuna. However, Setsuna summons Kanna and Rena, with Kanna easily overpowering the possessed Shoko and Rena able to successfully remove the demon from Shoko.

After finding out how close Setsuna was with Kanna and Rena, Shoko began to see them as potential rivals. As the story progresses, Shoko has slowly started to get her feelings across to Setsuna. In one instant after being drugged, Shoko practically flirted with Setsuna, and while she was half-asleep she said to him that she wasn't going to let Kanna and Rena take him away because he was her "servant". Due to her Tsundere personality she hides her fears and insecurities (such as hiding that she likes Setsuna by bullying him to get attention.)

Even though she is the sole heiress to the Arima Group, she is at odds with her parents and lives alone in an apartment. However, after she became Hina's master due to the Brand of Domination, Hina has moved in to take care of the household chores. Although Shoko treats Hina as a servant/slave most of the time, she does show that she cares about Hina occasionally such as saying if Hina wants out than to find a way to break the contract and won't mind it if Hina does break the contract.

Oni

The Middleman is a demon who dresses up as a gentleman, complete with a suit, top-hat and monocle. He seeks out people who no longer see a value in their own life and offers them a deal, they live for a year before having their heart eaten and dying at the end of the year for a million Yen. He also makes sure the chosen individual understands that they will definitely die at the end of the year, but doesn't hesitate to point out the benefits to the deal over killing themselves then and there To seal the deal, he has the person drink a potion called the "Banrikou", which marinates the heart in question with the combined power and wisdom of the Oni Clan to be devoured by the one who paid for it at the end of the year. This potion causes the heart to give off an aroma which lures other demons who'd want the power contained in it. So the competitor who is summoned the most to protect the heart wins the right to eat it at the end of the year. He also appears to be a bit of a flake, as Kanna commented that he always forgets to inform the customers of little details such as that the sisters who 'bought' and will eat his heart at the end of the year will be living with him for that year. Or that lesser demons will be attracted by the scent of his heart and try to consume it on the spot themselves.

She wields a powerful "Golden Staff" (kanabō) that acts as a bludgeoning weapon, which makes her a powerhouse. Kanna is loud, brash, and likes to approach problems head-on. Despite her personality, when it comes to her family, she is willing to sacrifice her status as royalty to ensure their safety. With her voluptuous figure, she teases Setsuna to get him to think only of her. She became a teacher at Setsuna's school in order to be with him at all times. Because demons eat much more than humans (about 2-3 times as much, but she eats 5 times as much,) she has also taken a job as a hostess to help with expenses. Although she is only seen at that job on the day she was hired and if she kept the job even after becoming Setsuna's homeroom teacher at school isn't shown. She is a Power type Oni who inherited Speed from the previous transcended leader (meaning the leader won and ate the Banrikou Heart gaining extreme power in the previous contest,) so she excels in both strength and speed. Her preferred fighting method is using raw power to smash he enemies in a Full Frontal Assault. As a result the area she fights in tends to get damaged as well. Hina even remarks to Shoko that on powers alone, Kanna is the strongest member of the tribe rendering front attacks as pointless gestures.

After accidentally drinking a love potion and experiencing memory loss as the side effect, Kanna developed a new personality. She became a very shy, polite, and naïve girl. This led to her being easily deceived by Rena's jokes and unable to defend herself from little kids when bullied despite being older and extremely much stronger. Although the love potion was meant for males, it still had an effect on Kanna, who became enamored with Setsuna. Whether this was her true feelings or an effect of the love potion is hard to tell, but she feels Setsuna is a very special person to her even if she can't remember why. Kanna fell deeper in love with Setsuna for his caring personality and willingness to protect her. When she confessed her love for him, Setsuna stopped her and claimed that her feelings were due to the effects of the potion. Determined to prove that her feelings are real, Kanna vowed to confess again once her memories returned. After she recovered her memories, it seemed almost for a moment that Kanna had returned to normal with no recall of the events during her amnesia. However, a quick glance from Setsuna caused Kanna to blush, hinting that she, at the very least, remembered her confession to Setsuna. Towards the end of the series how much she remembers of her time while having amnesia is further revealed along with how much Setsuna and the Banrikou Heart mean to her. She also states how she's having so much fun in the more interesting human world that staying for a year is not enough which surprises everyone.

Rena is an extreme introvert and prefers to communicate by writing in a notebook. With these swords, she is able to remove a demon from a possessed human without harming the host. Like Kanna, Rena has obtained a job at a maid café to help out with expenses. Her demure nature makes her much more amiable among normal humans, which is the reason why she is extremely popular at the maid cafe. Why she never talks is never revealed, but she can talk even if only in her ultimate mode (she released all her power at once making her look more demonic than human and extremely increasing her power for a short time. Only members of the Royal Family bloodline have the ability to do this.) She is an Assassin type Oni meaning that she excels in speed and while much stronger than a human she's still much weaker than Kanna or Erionelle. As such she causes significantly less damage to the area than Kanna and goes for quick, accurate and targeted strikes rather than smashing through everything like Kanna.

Usually the quiet type, Rena has shown her temper on various occasions, mainly in order to protect Setsuna from demons or from Kanna's attempts to undermine her own bid for his heart. Rena cares deeply for Setsuna and worries for his safety. She constantly writes safety precautions in her notebook and makes sure Setsuna understands them. Thus, even when she battled Kanna over Setsuna's heart she wasn't really trying very hard. Mainly because she's more interested in beating Kanna for once rather than the power she'd receive from the heart.

Ever since they were young, Kanna and Rena would bully Hina, who withstood everything in hopes that they would be friends. It was Hina's dream to become a Sage. She studied hard for ten years for the chance to take the Sage Test, only to find out it was cancelled because Kanna and Rena had begun the Banriko Heart challenge. Furious, Hina plotted against her cousins. She persuaded Shoko to bring Setsuna to an isolated location. When Setsuna called forth Kanna and Rena, they were all stuck in a trap. Shoko, realizing that Hina meant harm to Setsuna, broke the source of the trap. Ironically, the Brand of Dominion meant for her cousins was placed on Hina, naming Shoko as her master. In order for Hina to survive, she must drink a bit of Shoko's blood every day. As a result, Hina was forced to move in with Shoko and work as a maid. Although she hates being treated like a slave she does appreciate the care Shoko shows for her at times and has kept quiet about Setsuna's impending demise at the end of his contract. She cares about Shoko so much that she went into her Ultimate form when Shoko was critically wounded during a fight. Rather than a Speed or Power type like her cousins, she's a Sage type which specializes in magic and intelligence.

Through the use of her long smoking pipe, Hina is able to summon Smoke Familiars which resemble large stuffed animals. In her Ultimate form they look more like large, savage versions of animals rather than toys. She also enjoys making potions and has a good knowledge of medicine and herbs. Hina originally had a bad opinion of Setsuna; however, after finding out that he lied to Shoko about his circumstances in order to not worry her, she began to realize he was a lot stronger than she gave him credit for. She also comments on how he has such a pure heart that he won't even strike back at the little kids who were bullying him for interfering with their fun with Kanna.

Little is known about this new transfer student to Setsuna's class except that she is the princess of Adenbulk, the Western Oni World which are known as Zombie Oni and are constantly battling (and losing to) the Oni Royal Family (which Kanna and Rena are part of.) This is because the Oni Royal Family treats and thinks about the Zombie Oni as dirty, weak and not worth enough to even be considered servants.  With soulless eyes and long black hair that goes down to her legs, she has been tasked with the assassination of the two demon princesses under the orders of her father. Unlike the other Oni shown so far, she shows absolutely no desire to obtain the Banrikou Heart and only wishes to eliminate the White and Black Princess. Destroying the Banrikou Heart is only a means to prevent the princesses from receiving more power and the extreme humiliation they'd receive for failing to protect the heart. As a Royal Zombie Oni she is able to use Death Illusion, a spell that forces a target to experience their most feared death over and over until the day they die or the spell is removed by somebody else, with ease where other Oni would be hard pressed to even attempt much less control the spell. While stronger than Rena she is no match for Kanna. She develops a huge crush on Setsuna after he buys her lunch and saves her shortly after they met. As such she protects him from a minion after his heart and performs a special ritual known only to the Zombie Clan on him. Being more direct than Kanna or Rena with her feelings for him she keeps using rather aggressive, blunt and direct methods such as using the others as hostages if he doesn't go to her home and marry her. How her family and court are reacting to this is unknown. In her true form she doesn't take on an Oni's demonic appearance like the other princesses but looks just as she does in her human guise except for her skin turning a pale violet tinged grey and her hair turning silver. Although how is not explained her clothes also change to a dark purple frilled headband, black and grey plate mail boots, black and grey plate mail gauntlets covering her hands to upper arms, and an open dark purple coat over a white frilled dress with a ripped hem. She wields a double-edged, guardless greatsword and is a Power type Oni that excels in strength. While angry with how the Royal Oni Clan looks down on the Zombie Oni she is similar to Kanna in that she doesn't like using dishonorable means but prefers to fight head on at full power.

Media

Manga
Written by Korean manhwa creator Dall-Young Lim and illustrated by Soo-Hyun Lee, Onihime VS debuted in the special "Hard" issue of Kill Time Communication's male-oriented manga magazine Comic Valkyrie, published on October 29, 2007, and began regular serialization in Comic Valkyrie afterwards. The first bound volume was released on September 30, 2008, with a total of three volumes available in Japan as of August 25, 2010 under KTC's Valkyrie Comics imprint. The series had a long hiatus from July 27, 2010 to January 27, 2012, resuming serialization in Comic Valkyrie following the finale of Unbalance Unbalance, and ended serialization in the November 2012 issue with 26 chapters. The fourth and final volume was released on November 2, 2012.

In South Korea, it is published by Haksan Culture Company under the title of Phantom Princess VS, and was serialized in Booking.

References

External links
 Onihime VS at Comic Valkyrie 

2007 manga
Seinen manga
Action anime and manga
Fantasy anime and manga
Romantic comedy anime and manga
Haksan Culture Company titles
Harem anime and manga
School life in anime and manga